Sgroppino is an alcoholic mixed drink originating in Venice, Italy, and based on lemon sorbet with vodka, optionally topped up with the Italian sparkling wine Prosecco.

References

Cocktails with Prosecco
Cocktails with vodka
Italian alcoholic drinks